Bloody Canyon is a valley in Mono County, California, in the United States.

The canyon was so named from the blood shed by work horses on the jagged rocks on the canyon's steep trails.

References

Canyons and gorges of California
Landforms of Mono County, California